International House New York, also known as I-House, is a private, independent, non-profit residence and program center for postgraduate students, research scholars, trainees, and interns, located at 500 Riverside Drive in Morningside Heights, Manhattan, New York City.

The I-House residential community typically consists of 700+ students and scholars from over 100 countries annually, with about one-third of those coming from the United States. The residential experience includes programming designed to promote mutual respect, friendship, and leadership skills across cultures and fields of study. International House has attracted prominent guest speakers through the years, from Eleanor Roosevelt and Isaac Stern to Sandra Day O'Connor, Valerie Jarrett, George Takei, and Nelson Mandela. Students attend various universities and schools throughout the city, which include Columbia University, Juilliard School, Actors' Studio Drama School, New York University, the Manhattan School of Music, the Union Theological Seminary in the City of New York, Teachers College, Columbia University, and the City University of New York.

The original entrance to International House is inscribed with the motto written by John D. Rockefeller Jr.: "That Brotherhood May Prevail"; the piazza (The Abby O'Neill Patio) of its entrance opens onto Sakura Park, the site of Japan's original gift of cherry trees to New York City in 1912.

The 500 Riverside Drive building, designed in the Italianite style by architects Louis E. Jallade and Marc Eidlitz and Sons, was built in 1924 and was listed on the U.S. National Register of Historic Places as International House in 1999.

History
The initial impetus for forming I-House occurred when, after a chance encounter with a lone graduate student from China on the steps of Columbia University in 1909, YMCA official Harry Edmonds began efforts to obtain funding to establish the House in order to foster relationships between students from different countries. International House opened its doors in 1924 with funding from John D. Rockefeller Jr., who later would provide funds for similar houses at the University of California, Berkeley and the University of Chicago, as well as the Cleveland Hoadley Dodge family.  Other Rockefeller family members to have served on the board of trustees include Abby Aldrich Rockefeller. John D. Rockefeller III, David and Peggy Rockefeller, David Rockefeller Jr., Abby M. O'Neill, and Peter M.O'Neill.

International House was one of the first of many international houses in a global movement to create a diverse environment for international students seeking to further their education. John D. Rockefeller Jr. built International Houses at Berkeley, Chicago, and Paris prior to World War II.  Other cities with international houses include: Philadelphia, Harrisburg, San Diego, and Washington, D.C., United States; Melbourne, Brisbane, Sydney, Darwin, and Wollongong, Australia; Alberta, Canada; Auckland, New Zealand; and London, England.

The chairman of the board of trustees is longtime diplomat and businessman Ambassador Frank G. Wisner.  The chairman of the board's executive committee is Peter O'Neill. The latter role has also been held by William D. Rueckert, a member of the Dodge family, whose generous gifts contributed to the development of both International House and the Columbia University Teachers College. In May 2021, Sebastian Fries became president and CEO of International House, succeeding Brian Polovoy, a former partner with the law firm Shearman & Sterling and a board member of 11 years, who was appointed interim president from October 2020 to April 2021. The previous president was Calvin Sims, a former program officer at The Ford Foundation and foreign correspondent for The New York Times.

Trustees and board members

Current chairman of the board
Frank G. Wisner

Honorary trustees
David Rockefeller, Honorary Chairman
Henry A. Kissinger
Abby M. O'Neill
Daisy M. Soros '51
Paul A. Volcker
John C. Whitehead

Chairman of the executive committee
Peter O'Neill

Past chairmen of the board
George W. Wickersham
Henry L. Stimson
George C. Marshall
John J. McCloy
Charles W. Yost
George W. Ball
Henry A. Kissinger
Gerald R. Ford
John C. Whitehead
Paul A. Volcker
William D. Rueckert

Past honorary chairman
Dwight D. Eisenhower

Notable alumni

An estimated 65,000 individuals have lived in I-House from around the world. Among the notable alumni are:

Chinua Achebe, Nigerian writer, author of Things Fall Apart
Pina Bausch, German choreographer
Warren Bebbington, retired Vice-Chancellor, University of Adelaide
Dietrich Bonhoeffer '31, theologian and anti-Nazi dissident
Leonard Cohen, poet and songwriter
Shelby Cullom Davis, U.S. investment banker, Ambassador to Switzerland
Kiran Desai, Indian author and novelist
Pamella D'Pella, actress
Mark Eyskens, Prime Minister of Belgium
Ibrahim Gambari '71, UN under-secretary general
James P. Gorman, chairman and CEO of Morgan Stanley
Jorge Ibargüengoitia, Mexican novelist
Burl Ives, Academy Award-winning actor
Arundhati Katju '17, attorney and pioneer of LGBT rights in India
Jerzy Kosinski, Polish-born writer, author of Being There
Wassily Leontief, winner of the Nobel Prize in Economic Sciences
Flora Lewis, New York Times journalist
Benjamin Mkapa, former president, Tanzania
Mark Mathabane, South African-born writer, author of Kaffir Boy
Ashley Montague, British anthropologist
Ariane Morin, Swiss law professor
Vikram Pandit, Chairman & CEO, Citigroup
Dale Peck, US writer, novelist, and literary critic
I.M. Pei, Chinese-born architect
Hans-Gert Poettering, former president, European Parliament
Leontyne Price, '52 opera star
Carlo Rubbia, winner of the Nobel Prize in Physics
David Sainsbury, British businessman, philanthropist, Labour cabinet minister
Edward J. Sparling '29, Founder, Roosevelt University, Chicago
Sydney Taurel '71, Chairman & CEO, Eli Lilly
Tatsuro Toyoda '58, Senior Advisor, Toyota Motor Corporation
Shirley Verrett, opera star
Douschka Martin Sweets (Ackerman), Artist, Teacher

See also
International House Berkeley
International Students House, London
International Student House of Washington, D.C.
Goodenough College, London
 International House, UC San Diego
Cité internationale universitaire, Paris

References

External links

Official website
NYT Chronicle (1995): International House

Buildings and structures on the National Register of Historic Places in Manhattan
Renaissance Revival architecture in New York City
Residential buildings completed in 1924
Institutions founded by the Rockefeller family
Morningside Heights, Manhattan
Residential buildings in Manhattan
Education in New York City
1924 establishments in New York City